Walkenried is a municipality in the district of Göttingen, in Lower Saxony, Germany. It is situated in the southern Harz, approx. 15 km south of Braunlage, and 15 km northwest of Nordhausen.

Walkenried was the seat of the Samtgemeinde ("collective municipality") Walkenried, which was abolished in November 2016 when Wieda and Zorge were incorporated into the municipality.

The village was principally known as the location of Walkenried Abbey, the third Cistercian monastery established on German-speaking territory, founded in 1127 and secularised in 1668.

References

Villages in the Harz
Göttingen (district)
Duchy of Brunswick